Brigitte Chamarande (1953 – 14 March 2022) was a French actress. She was known for her roles in Subway, L'Étudiante, and Betty.

References

1953 births
2022 deaths
20th-century French actresses
21st-century French actresses
French film actresses
French television actresses